The 1936 United States Senate election in Massachusetts was held on November 3. Incumbent Democratic Senator Marcus A. Coolidge declined to stand for re-election. Republican Henry Cabot Lodge Jr. won the race to succeed him over Democratic Boston mayor James Michael Curley and former Suffolk County prosecutor Thomas C. O'Brien.

The election was notable because although Democrats expanded their overall Senate majority to 74 seats, Massachusetts was the only seat gained by Republicans. Curley's campaign may have been damaged by President Roosevelt's decision to remain aloof and the candidacy of O'Brien, who siphoned many usually Democratic Irish-American votes in Boston.

Republican primary

Candidates
 Alonzo B. Cook, former Massachusetts Auditor
 Guy M. Gray, State Representative
 Henry Cabot Lodge, Jr., State Representative and grandson of former Senator Henry Cabot Lodge
 Thomas C. O'Brien, former Suffolk County  District Attorney (also running as Democrat)

Withdrew
Sinclair Weeks, former Mayor of Newton and son of former Senator John W. Weeks (after loss at convention)

Results

All three losing candidates entered the general election as the nominees of third parties. Cook ran on an "Economy" ticket, Gray ran on the Social Justice ticket, and O'Brien ran on the national Union Party ticket.

Democratic

Candidates
 James Michael Curley, Governor of Massachusetts and former Mayor of Boston and U.S. Representative
 Robert E. Greenwood, Mayor of Fitchburg
 Thomas C. O'Brien, former Suffolk County District Attorney (also running as Republican)

Declined
 Marcus A. Coolidge, incumbent Senator

Results
The Democratic nominee was Governor and former (and future) Mayor of Boston James Michael Curley.  President Franklin Roosevelt declined to endorse Curley, which may have affected the final results.

General election

Candidates
Alonzo B. Cook, former Massachusetts Auditor (Economy)
Albert Sprague Coolidge (Socialist)
James Michael Curley, Governor of Massachusetts and former mayor of Boston and U.S. Representative (Democratic)
Ernest L. Dodge (Socialist Labor)
Charles Flaherty (Communist)
Guy M. Gray, State Representative (Social Justice)
Moses H. Gulesian (Townsend)
Henry Cabot Lodge Jr., State Representative from Beverly, journalist, and grandson of former Senator Henry Cabot Lodge (Republican)
Wilbur D. Moon (Prohibition)
Thomas C. O'Brien, Suffolk County District Attorney (Union)

Campaign
Lodge was highly critical of Curley's tenure as Governor, but did not mention him by name. Curley resorted to personal attacks, referring to Lodge, who was only 34 years old, as "Little Boy Blue" and "a young man who parts both his hair and his name in the middle." He accused Lodge of being a reactionary in the supposed mold of his grandfather, Henry Cabot Lodge. Lodge criticized Curley for his failure to achieve federal funding for Massachusetts during the Great Depression, which may have been the result of Curley's personal feud with President Roosevelt. He defended his own record as supportive of labor and economic intervention and his grandfather's as protective of the laboring classes via restriction on immigration and opposition to international adventurism.

O'Brien, who ran at the urging of Charles Coughlin, campaigned for the urban Irish Catholic vote. His campaign was spurred by Curley's efforts to align with President Roosevelt, from whom Coughlin had broken earlier in his term.

Roosevelt made a personal swing through the state as part of his re-election campaign, but when Curley tried to get a photograph with Roosevelt, he made a point of turning away.

Later in the race, Curley tried to have Lodge's name removed from the ballot by arguing, through his political ally and Lodge's primary opponent Alonzo B. Cook, that "Jr." was reserved for the son of a man with the same name, and Lodge was instead the grandson. This controversy was quashed when Lodge produced a birth certificate reading "Jr." In fact, Curley's own legal name did not include "Michael", but he was listed on the ballot as "James Michael Curley" nonetheless. The Lodge campaign did not challenge this discrepancy.

Results

See also 
 United States Senate elections, 1936 and 1937

References

Massachusetts
1936
1936 Massachusetts elections